The 2009–10 Football League Championship (known as the Coca-Cola Championship for sponsorship reasons) was the sixth season of the league under its current title and eighteenth season under its current league division format. It started on 7 August 2009.

Changes from previous season

Team changes

From Championship
Promoted to Premier League
 Wolverhampton Wanderers
 Birmingham City
 Burnley

Relegated to League One
 Norwich City
 Southampton
 Charlton Athletic

To Championship
Relegated from Premier League
 Newcastle United
 Middlesbrough
 West Bromwich Albion

Promoted from League One
 Leicester City
 Peterborough United
 Scunthorpe United

Rule changes

On field rule changes
 'Home Grown Players' rule which aims to encourage the development of young footballers at League clubs. The new rule will require clubs to name at least four players in their matchday squad that have been registered domestically, for a minimum of three seasons, prior to their 21st birthday
 For the first time clubs will also have the opportunity to name seven substitutes (previously five), three of which may enter the field of play (no change)

Note: "Amendments to the laws of the game 2009–2010" also applied

Off field rule changes
 Financial regulations relating to tax payments. From now on, any club that falls behind with its employee related payments to HMRC will be subject to a transfer embargo until such time as the debt is cleared

Team overview

Stadia and locations

1 Ground contains some terracing

Personnel and sponsoring

Managerial changes

League table
A total of 24 teams contested the division, including 18 sides remaining in the division from last season, three relegated from the Premier League, and three promoted from League One.

Play-offs

First leg

Second leg

Blackpool win 6–4 on aggregate

Cardiff City 3–3 Leicester City on aggregate. Cardiff City win 4–3 on penalties

Final

Blackpool are promoted to the Premier League

Results
Fixtures for the 2009–10 season were announced by The Football League on 17 June 2009.

Top goalscorers and assists

Season statistics

Scoring
First goal of the season: Miles Addison for Derby County against Peterborough United, 4:00 minutes (8 August 2009)
Fastest goal in a match: 23 seconds
 Billy Clarke for Blackpool against Preston North End (30 November 2009)
 Daryl Murphy for Ipswich Town against Middlesbrough (6 February 2010)
Goal scored at the latest point in a match: 90+6:12 – Pablo Couñago for Ipswich Town against Coventry City (16 January 2010)
First own goal of the season: Kaspars Gorkšs (Queens Park Rangers) for Plymouth Argyle, 90+2:26 minutes (15 August 2009)
First penalty kick of the season: Paul Hartley (scored) for Bristol City against Preston North End, 48:35 (8 August 2009)
Widest winning margin: 6
Bristol City 0–6 Cardiff City (26 January 2010)
Reading 6–0 Peterborough United (17 April 2010)
Most goals in one half: 6
Newcastle United 6–1 Barnsley (5 March 2010)
Bristol City 2–5 Doncaster Rovers (5 March 2010)
Most goals in one half by a single team: 5
Newcastle United 6–1 Barnsley (5 March 2010)
Most goals scored by losing team: 3
Sheffield United 3–4 Cardiff City (24 October 2009)
Sheffield United 4–3 Plymouth Argyle (27 February 2010)
Bristol City 5–3 Barnsley (23 March 2010)
Doncaster Rovers 4–3 Scunthorpe United (24 April 2010)
Nottingham Forest 3–4 Blackpool (11 May 2010)
Most goals scored by one player in a match: 4
Michael Chopra (Cardiff City vs. Derby County) – 36, 57, 62, 75 minutes (29 September 2009)

Discipline
First yellow card of the season: Rhys Williams for Middlesbrough against Sheffield United, 49:15 minutes (7 August 2009)
First red card of the season: Luke Chambers for Nottingham Forest against Reading, 87:41 minutes (8 August 2009)
Card given at latest point in a game: Wes Morgan (yellow) at 90+7:07 minutes for Nottingham Forest against Bristol City (3 April 2010)
Most yellow cards in a single match: 9
Bristol City 2–3 Sheffield United – 4 for Bristol City (Lee Johnson, Louis Carey, Jamie McAllister and Ivan Sproule) and 5 for Sheffield United (Jamie Ward, Kyle Walker, Darius Henderson, Jordan Stewart and Stephen Quinn) (28 November 2009)
Cardiff City 2–3 Leicester City – 3 for Cardiff City (Paul Quinn, Mark Hudson, Stephen McPhail) and 6 for Leicester City (Alex Bruce, Nolberto Solano, Andy King, Lloyd Dyer, Richie Wellens, Steve Howard) (11 May 2010)
Quickest card given at the start of the match: 26 Seconds – Nicky Maynard for Bristol City against Nottingham Forest (7 November 2009)
Quickest card given after coming on: 1:07 minutes – Alassane N'Diaye for Crystal Palace against Blackpool (20 March 2010)
Most fouls: Jay Bothroyd 103 fouls
Total number of yellow cards: 1636
Total number of red cards: 86

Monthly awards

Team of the Year

{| class="sortable" border="2" cellpadding="4" cellspacing="0" style="text-align:center; margin: 1em 1em 1em 0; background: #f9f9f9; border: 1px #aaa solid; border-collapse: collapse; font-size: 95%;"
|-
!class="unsortable" width=24px|No.
!class="unsortable" width=24px|Nat.
!class="unsortable" |Position
!class="unsortable" width=170px|Name
!class="unsortable" |Club
|-
| 1
| 
| GK
| Lee Camp
| Nottingham Forest
|-
| 16
| 
| RB
| Chris Gunter
| Nottingham Forest
|-
| 2
| 
| CB
| Fabricio Coloccini
| Newcastle United
|-
| 2
| 
| CB
| Ashley Williams
| Swansea City
|-
| 3
| 
| LB
| José Enrique
| Newcastle United
|-
| 17
| 
| RM
| Graham Dorrans
| West Bromwich Albion
|-
| 4
| 
| CM
| Kevin Nolan
| Newcastle United
|-
| 26
| 
| CM
| Charlie Adam
| Blackpool
|-
| 7
| 
| LM
| Peter Whittingham
| Cardiff City
|-
| 24
| 
| ST
| Andy Carroll
| Newcastle United
|-
| 8
| 
| ST
| Michael Chopra
| Cardiff City

Events

Controversy
 15 August 2009
During a game between Bristol City and Crystal Palace, Freddie Sears scored a goal that ricocheted off the stanchion and went back out, but the linesman didn't see the goal and so it was disallowed. Crystal Palace manager Neil Warnock called for a replay. Following the game, the three officials were suspended until it could be solved.

 28 November 2009
The tie between Plymouth and Barnsley was abandoned after 58 minutes because of heavy rain affecting the pitch. Barnsley were winning 4–1 and manager Mark Robins argued that it was a "let off" for Plymouth and that the travelling Barnsley fans should be reimbursed. The postponed match took place on 30 March, where it ended in a 0–0 draw.

Crystal Palace administration
On 27 January 2010, the Football League had announced that Crystal Palace had been placed into administration and Sheffield firm P&A Partnership were appointed as administrators for the club. Palace were docked ten points and dropped from 9th to 21st. They managed to survive another season in the Championship, but only after drawing 2–2 with Sheffield Wednesday on the final day and confined Wednesday to League One football in 2010–11.

References

External links
Championship official site

 
EFL Championship seasons
1
2
Eng